Bansi is a town and municipal board situated on a bank of the Rapti River in the Siddharthnagar district in the state of Uttar Pradesh, India.

Geography

Demographics
As of the 2011 Indian Census, Bansi Nagar Palika Parishad had a total population of 41,057. 21,105 males constituted 51% of the population and females 49% with 19,952 individuals. Bansi has an average literacy rate of 58%, lower than the national average of 59.5%, with 61% of the males and 39% of females literate. Eighteen percent of the population is between 0 and 6 years of age. There is a total of 6,152 households in Bansi. The total number of workers in Bansi is 11,244, comprising 7,395 regular workers and 3,849 irregular workers.

Travel and connectivity journey
Bansi is well connected to the nearby towns and cities. It is the center of the activities, and many government offices are located in Bansi.

Air transport
The nearest airport is Gorakhpur Airport.

Railways
The nearest railway stations are Siddharthnagar railway station and Basti railway station.

Roads
UPSRTC bus station and a private bus stand are located in the city. Regular buses go to Siddharthnagar, Gorakhpur, Basti, Khalilabad, and Domariaganj. In addition, buses to Lucknow, Kanpur, Allahabad, Ayodhya, Faizabad, Akbarpur, Tanda, Rajesultanpur, Azamgarh, and Delhi run many times daily. Private buses and jeeps are also available in many neighboring towns.

References

Cities and towns in Siddharthnagar district